Nicolae Oprescu (born 1 March 1953) is a Romanian gymnast. He competed at the 1972 Summer Olympics, the 1976 Summer Olympics and the 1980 Summer Olympics.

References

1953 births
Living people
Romanian male artistic gymnasts
Olympic gymnasts of Romania
Gymnasts at the 1972 Summer Olympics
Gymnasts at the 1976 Summer Olympics
Gymnasts at the 1980 Summer Olympics
Gymnasts from Bucharest
20th-century Romanian people
21st-century Romanian people